Burning Up or Burnin' Up may refer to:

Books
Burning Up, romance novel by Susan Andersen
 Burning Up, romance novel by Caroline B. Cooney
 Burning Up, romance novel omnibus by Angela Knight, Nalini Singh, Virginia Kantra and Meljean Brook

Film
 Burning Up (film), a 1930 Paramount Pictures film about a racing car driver

Music
 Burning Up (album), 1995 album by Sizzla
 "Burnin' Up" (Imagination song), 1981
 "Burnin' Up" (Jessie J song), 2014
 "Burning Up" (Madonna song), 1982
 "Burning Up" (Ne-Yo song), 2012
 "Burnin' Up" (Jonas Brothers song), 2008
 "Burnin' Up" (Faith Evans song), 2001
 "Burnin' Up", song by Judas Priest from the album, Killing Machine
 "Burning Up", single by Lloyd Williams, 1960s
 "Burning Up", single by Billy Young, 1960s
 "Burning Up", single by Carlene Davis, Y. Shaka Shaka, 1988
 "Burnin Up", song by Ken Carson from Project X
 "Burning Up", song by Kylie Minogue from Fever
 "Burning Up", song by Mi-Sex, D. Martin, K. Stanton, S. Gilpin, R. Hodgkinson	1979 from Space Race
 "Burning Up", song by Tygers of Pan Tang, Weir, Cox, Laws, Dick 1980 from Wild Cat
 "Burning Up", song by Ladytron from Velocifero
 "Burnin' Up", song by Mungo Jerry, written Ray Dorset 1974